Lochaber Loch is a small, lowland freshwater loch that lies among steep-sided hills, approximately  to the west of Dumfries, Scotland. The loch was surveyed on 4 May 1905 by James Murray and L.W. Collett as part of Sir John Murray's Bathymetrical Survey of Fresh-Water Lochs of Scotland 1897-1909.

Swans, great crested grebes and ospreys can be seen on the loch. There is a  bird hide on the water's edge.

The loch in the Mabie Forest, which is managed by the Forestry Commission.

References 

Lochaber
Lochaber